Virgilio Dávila Cabrera (January 28, 1869 – August 22, 1943), was a Puerto Rican poet from the modern literary era, educator, politician and businessman.

Early years
Dávila was born in the town of Toa Baja. he was influenced by the literary collection of his parents, both of whom were teachers, at an early age. He attended private schools where he received both his primary and secondary education. Dávila earned his bachelor's degree from the Civil Institute of Higher Learning in 1895. He taught school in the town of Gurabo.

Biografia
Dávila and his wife had a son on October 7, 1898, José Antonio Dávila, in the City of Bayamón, who would one day take after his father and become a poet himself. His experiences as a teacher and in agriculture later reflected in his poetry. In 1903, Dávila published his first book of poems "Patria". In this book he included poems which he wrote about Jose de Diego, Federico Degetau and Lola Rodríguez de Tió. He also included poems about the island and love in general. In 1904, Dávila became director of the weekly publication "Chantelier", which he co-founded with Braulio Dueño Colón.

In 1905, Dávila ran for Mayor of the Municipality of Bayamon. He won the election and served as the municipality's mayor from 1905 to 1910.

Together with Dueño Colon and Manuel Fernandez Juncos, he prepared a book of school songs. Dávila wrote many poems that were published in many publications and newspapers of the day. He also wrote a book for his grandchildren, titled  A Book for my Grandchildren in 1928. Dávila style, considered traditional, was  greatly influenced by Victor Hugo.

Written works
Among his better known poems are:
 "Patria" (1903)
 "Viviendo y Amando" (1912)
 "Aromas del Terruño" (1916)
 "Nostalgia"
 "No des tu Tierra al Extraño".
The following is a short version of "No des tu Tierra al Extraño" ("Do not give your land to a stranger!"):

Later years
Dávila died in the City of Bayamón on August 22, 1943. He is buried in that city's Porta Coeli Cemetery. A public housing complex, a school, and an avenue in Bayamón bear the name of Dávila in his honor.

See also

Puerto Rican Poetry
List of Puerto Rican writers
List of Puerto Ricans
Puerto Rican literature
List of mayors of Bayamón, Puerto Rico

References

1869 births
1943 deaths
Mayors of places in Puerto Rico
People from Toa Baja, Puerto Rico
Puerto Rican poets
Puerto Rican male writers
Mayors of Bayamón, Puerto Rico
20th-century Puerto Rican poets